Geoffrey 'Geoff' Laws (born 1956), is a male former weightlifter who competed for Great Britain and England.

Weightlifting career
Laws represented Great Britain in the 1980 Summer Olympics and 1984 Summer Olympics.

He represented England and won a gold medal in the 56 kg bantamweight division, at the 1982 Commonwealth Games in Brisbane, Queensland, Australia. Four years later he represented England in the 60 kg featherweight division at the 1986 Commonwealth Games in Edinburgh, Scotland and represented England in a third Games, at the 1990 Commonwealth Games in Auckland, New Zealand.

References

1956 births
English male weightlifters
Commonwealth Games medallists in weightlifting
Commonwealth Games silver medallists for England
Weightlifters at the 1982 Commonwealth Games
Weightlifters at the 1986 Commonwealth Games
Weightlifters at the 1990 Commonwealth Games
Weightlifters at the 1980 Summer Olympics
Weightlifters at the 1984 Summer Olympics
Olympic weightlifters of Great Britain
Living people
Medallists at the 1982 Commonwealth Games